Municipal Stadium is a multi-purpose stadium in Vaslui, Romania. It is used mostly for football matches and is the home ground of Sporting Vaslui. The stadium has 9,240 seats, and it is covered by natural grass. The floodlighting system, with a density of 2000 lux, has been inaugurated in 2008.

See also

List of football stadiums in Romania

References

External links
 Stadionul Municipal (Vaslui)

Sport in Vaslui
Football venues in Romania
Multi-purpose stadiums in Romania
FC Vaslui